Debarwa is a market town in central Eritrea. It is situated about 25 kilometers south of the capital Asmara, and has a population of about 25,000 inhabitants. It is the capital of the Debarwa district (Tsilima) in the Debub ("Southern") administrative region (one of five in Eritrea).

History
Debarwa was formerly the capital of an Kingdom named Medri Bahri, which roughly translates as Land of the Sea. It was ruled by the Bahr Negus (King of the Sea). The Portuguese expedition under Cristóvão da Gama spent the rainy season of 1542 in Debarwa as the guests of the Bahr Negus. The Ottomans invaded part of Medri Bahri in 1557, and for several decades struggled for control over the local population and their Ethiopian neighbors. By the time everything settled, the Ottomans were confined to Suakin, Massawa, Hergigo and the immediate hinterlands, but at times their raids would reach into the Bogos, Hamasien and Habab districts of Eritrea.

In 1576 the Ethiopian Emperor Sarsa Dengel attacked Debarwa whereupon the Turkish garrison surrendered with all its firearms. Sarsa Dengel then seized the vast riches stored by the Turks in Debarwa and ordered the destruction of the mosque and the fort that was erected during the Ottoman occupation. In 1587, the Turks left the port of Hirgigo and advanced inland to take Debarwa again but was again defeated by Sarsa Dengel who killed the Turkish commander Kadawred Pasha in battle.

The city was hit hard by a typhus epidemic in 1893, which followed the misery of the Great Famine (1888-1892). A French visitor described Debarwa as "decimated", and all that was left of the once prosperous town were "a few piles of stones, an almost ruined church, and a few wretched hovels".

Demographics
The majority of the population in Debarwa belongs to the Bihér-Tigrigna (Tigrinya-speaking) ethnic group. In terms of faith, local residents are mainly adherents of the Eritrean Orthodox Tewahdo Church.

Economy
Local people bring produce such as potatoes, tomatoes, chickens and grain to the market every Saturday. Aside from being a market town, it is also a mining town with resources of high grade gold, copper, silver and zinc, and an important transport route between the south-west corner of Zoba Debub and Asmara. The Japanese company Hitachi once operated a mine near Debarwa, but it was shut down in the 1960s due to the outbreak of the Eritrean War of Independence from Ethiopia.

References

Southern Region (Eritrea)
Populated places in Eritrea